Coleophora maritimella is a moth of the family Coleophoridae found in Africa and Europe.

Description
The wingspan is 9–11 mm.  Head whitish-brown. Antennae white, ringed with fuscous. Forewings light brownish, with a few darker scales ; costa whitish from base to 2/3 ; veins indistinctly marked with whitish lines. Hindwings grey  Only reliably identified by dissection and microscopic examination of the genitalia.
external image Adults are on wing from late June to early August.

The larvae feed on the seedheads of sea rush (Juncus maritimus) and sharp-pointed rush (Juncus acutus). The larval case is made from a hollowed seed of the food plant. Larvae can be found from September to May. Pupation takes place in May and June on a plant stem.

Distribution
The moth is found in Tunisia, Ireland, Great Britain, the Netherlands, Germany, Denmark, Sweden, France, Spain, Portugal, Italy, Sardinia, Sicily, Croatia, Albania, Greece, Bulgaria, Crete and Cyprus.

References

External links
 Bestimmungshilfe für die in Europa nachgewiesenen Schmetterlingsarten

maritimella
Moths described in 1873
Moths of Africa
Moths of Europe
Taxa named by Edward Newman